The ABS Aerolight Navigathor is a French powered parachute and roadable aircraft that was designed and produced by ABS Aerolight of Sérignan-du-Comtat. Now out of production, when it was available the aircraft was supplied as a complete ready-to-fly-aircraft and as a kit for amateur construction.

The company appears to have gone out of business in late 2007 and production ended.

Design and development

The aircraft carriage is built from a combination of metal tubing and composites and features a wedge-shaped boat hull. It features a  parachute-style wing, two-seats-in-tandem in an open cockpit, four-wheeled cross country all terrain vehicle style landing gear and a single  Hirth F-30 four-cylinder, horizontally opposed, two-stroke, aircraft engine, mounted in pusher configuration. In all modes the vehicle is powered by its ducted propeller.

Variants
ATE
Initial model flying car/boat, Air-Terre-Eau.
Navigathor
Improved model flying car/boat.

Specifications (Navigathor)

References

Navigathor
2000s French sport aircraft
2000s French ultralight aircraft
Single-engined pusher aircraft
Powered parachutes
Roadable aircraft